Idle and Thackley is a ward within the City of Bradford Metropolitan District Council in the county of West Yorkshire, England, named after the villages of Idle and Thackley around which it is drawn.
The population of 14,541 according to the  2001 UK census had increased at the 2011 Census to 16,135.

As well as the villages of Idle and Thackley, the ward includes the villages of Apperley Bridge, Greengates, a small part of the Thorpe Edge housing estate, and a part of Little London near Rawdon.

Councillors 
Idle and Thackley electoral ward is represented on Bradford Council by three Liberal Democrat councillors, Dominic Fear, Jeanette Sunderland and Alun Griffiths.

 indicates seat up for re-election.

See also
Listed buildings in Idle and Thackley

References

External links 

 BCSP (Internet Explorer only)
 BBC election results
 Council ward profile (pdf)
 

Wards of Bradford